Magno Alves de Araújo (born 13 January 1976) is a Brazilian professional footballer who plays as a striker.

Career 
Magno Alves was born in Aporá, Bahia, Brazil. Between 1998 and 2003 he made 265 appearances and scored 111 goals for Fluminense as a striker, winning the Rio State Championship in 2002. Alves' most famous match was against Santa Cruz. as he scored 5 goals, earning the nickname Magnata. After a short stint in the Korean Professional Football League (K-League), Alves joined Oita Trinita of the Japan Professional Football League (J1 League). In 2006, he joined J1 League champion, Gamba Osaka, as a replacement for the team's former ace striker Clemerson de Araújo Soares, who left the team for family reasons. He joined Saudi Arabian side Al-Ittihad after being sent away by Gamba Osaka due to disciplinary problems.

In July 2010, he signed a contract with Brazilian club Ceará.

He scored overall for Ceará 103 times in 224 matches, becoming the club's 6th goalscorer of all time.

As of 7 August 2021, he has scored 483+ goals in 986 official matches.

Career statistics

Club

International

Honours

Club 
 Rio de Janeiro State: 2002
 Brazilian Serie C: 1999
 Japanese Super Cup: 2007
 Ceará State: 2013, 2014
 Copa do Nordeste: 2015

Individual 
 Brazilian League Top Scorer: 2000
 J.League All-Star Soccer MVP: 2005
 AFC Champions League top scorer: 2006
 J.League Top Scorer: 2006
 J.League Best Eleven: 2006
 Qatari League top scorer: 2008–09

Notes

References

External links 
 
 
 
 
 
  
 
 
 Magno Alves at playmakerstats.com (English version of ogol.com.br)

1976 births
Living people
Association football forwards
Brazilian footballers
Brazilian expatriate footballers
Brazil international footballers
Criciúma Esporte Clube players
Fluminense FC players
Ceará Sporting Club players
Clube Atlético Mineiro players
Sport Club do Recife players
Jeonbuk Hyundai Motors players
Oita Trinita players
Gamba Osaka players
Ittihad FC players
Umm Salal SC players
Associação Esportiva Araçatuba players
Independente Futebol Clube players
Grêmio Novorizontino players
Clube Atlético Tubarão players
Floresta Esporte Clube players
Alagoinhas Atlético Clube players
Campeonato Brasileiro Série A players
Campeonato Brasileiro Série B players
Campeonato Brasileiro Série D players
K League 1 players
J1 League players
Saudi Professional League players
Qatar Stars League players
2001 FIFA Confederations Cup players
Sportspeople from Bahia
Brazilian expatriate sportspeople in South Korea
Brazilian expatriate sportspeople in Japan
Brazilian expatriate sportspeople in Saudi Arabia
Brazilian expatriate sportspeople in Qatar
Expatriate footballers in South Korea
Expatriate footballers in Japan
Expatriate footballers in Saudi Arabia
Expatriate footballers in Qatar
Caucaia Esporte Clube players